Rose geranium is the common name of two species of Pelargonium:
Pelargonium graveolens, species native to the Cape Provinces and the Northern Provinces of South Africa, Zimbabwe, and Mozambique
Pelargonium capitatum, species found in fynbos along the coast of South Africa, from Lamberts Bay in the Western Cape east to Kwazulu-Natal